Rose Tattoo is an Australian rock group formed in 1976. Rose Tattoo may also refer to:

Music
Rose Tattoo (Rose Tattoo album), a 1978 album by Rose Tattoo
Rose Tattoo (Tiffany album), a 2011 album by Tiffany
The Rose Tattoo (album), a 1983 album by Freddie Hubbard
"Rose Tattoo" (song), a song by Dropkick Murphys from their 2013 album Signed and Sealed in Blood

Other uses
The Rose Tattoo, a 1951 play by Tennessee Williams
The Rose Tattoo (film), a 1955 movie based upon the Tennessee Williams play
Rose Tattoo (comics), a character in Wildstorm Comics first appearing in 1996
The Lost Files of Sherlock Holmes: The Case of the Rose Tattoo, a 1996 video game